Das Dritte Reich (lit. "The Third Empire") may refer to:

 Nazi Germany, for the Nazis claimed their rule as a direct continuation of the Holy Roman Empire and the German Empire
 Das Dritte Reich, a novel of A. Moeller-Bruck about Nazi Germany

See also
 Reich

German words and phrases